Pseudautomeris salmonea is a moth of the family Saturniidae first described by Pieter Cramer in 1777. It is found in Suriname, Panama, French Guiana, Venezuela, Brazil and Colombia.

References

Moths described in 1777
Hemileucinae